Kim Kwang-song (born 19 February 1992) is a North Korean weighlifter. He competed at the 2013 World Championships in the Men's 77 kg, winning the Silver medal.

References

North Korean male weightlifters
1992 births
Living people
Weightlifters at the 2014 Asian Games
Asian Games medalists in weightlifting
World Weightlifting Championships medalists
Asian Games silver medalists for North Korea

Medalists at the 2014 Asian Games
21st-century North Korean people